Carlton Andrew Valentine II (born May 25, 1991) is an American college basketball coach who is currently the head coach at Loyola University Chicago, a position he assumed in 2021. He played college basketball at Oakland University in Michigan, where he later served as an assistant coach.

Playing career
Valentine played forward at Oakland from 2009 to 2013, where he was a member of two NCAA tournament teams. He finished his playing career second in career games played with the program, as well in the top 10 of both offensive and defensive rebound categories.

Coaching career
After his playing career, Valentine joined the Michigan State staff as a graduate manager, where his brother Denzel was a player. After two seasons with the program, Valentine joined the coaching staff at his alma mater Oakland as an assistant coach, the youngest assistant hired during head coach Greg Kampe's long tenure.

Loyola–Chicago
Valentine joined the coaching staff at Loyola–Chicago in 2017, where he worked as the program's coordinator for defense. In his first season with Loyola, the Ramblers went on a historic NCAA tournament run that went all the way to the Final Four.

Valentine was promoted to head coach of the program in 2021, following the departure of Porter Moser, who left to accept the head coaching position at Oklahoma. He was believed to be the youngest head coach in NCAA Division I men's basketball at the time of his hiring at the age of 29.

Personal life
Valentine's younger brother Denzel was an AP Player of the Year at Michigan State before being drafted by the Chicago Bulls with the 14th overall pick of the 2016 NBA draft. His father Carlton also played college basketball at Michigan State, and is currently the head coach of the basketball program at J. W. Sexton High School, where both brothers attended.

Head coaching record

References

External links
 
 Loyola–Chicago profile
 Oakland profile

1991 births
Living people
Forwards (basketball)
Loyola Ramblers men's basketball coaches
Michigan State Spartans men's basketball coaches
Oakland Golden Grizzlies men's basketball coaches
Oakland Golden Grizzlies men's basketball players
Sportspeople from Lansing, Michigan
Basketball coaches from Michigan
Basketball players from Michigan
African-American basketball coaches
African-American basketball players
21st-century African-American sportspeople